Michael J. Tildesley is Professor in Infectious disease modelling at the University of Warwick. He is a member of the Scientific Pandemic Influenza Modelling group (SPI-M) of SAGE.

Education
Born in Keighley, West Yorkshire, Tildesley went to school in the city of York and studied mathematics at Clare College, Cambridge. He read for his Ph.D. in 2003 with a thesis on Astrophysical Fluid Dynamics under the supervision of Nigel Weiss, before moving to the University of Warwick and transitioning into the field of infectious disease modeling, a field he has worked in ever since.

Research 
Tildesly's main area of research is the development of mathematical models to simulate the spread of livestock and zoonotic diseases. He has a particular interest in the targeting of control in the event of an outbreak to minimize the spread of disease.

References

External links 
Tildesley talking about epidemics on YouTube

Living people
Year of birth missing (living people)
Academics of the University of Warwick
Alumni of Clare College, Cambridge
English mathematicians